Dum Dum is a city in West Bengal, India.

Dum Dum or Dum Dums may also refer to:

Places 
Dum Dum (Lok Sabha constituency), the corresponding parliamentary constituency
Dum Dum (Vidhan Sabha constituency), assembly constituency
Dum Dum Uttar, assembly constituency
North Dumdum, city and municipality in West Bengal
South Dumdum, city and municipality in West Bengal
Dum Dum, a locality near Uki, New South Wales
Netaji Subhas Chandra Bose International Airport, formerly known as Dum Dum Airport
Dum Dum Junction railway station, main railway station of the namesake city adjacent to Dum Dum metro station
Dum Dum metro station, main underground railway station of the namesake city, which is adjacent to Dum Dum Junction railway station
Dumdum, Kaimur, village in Bihar

Music 
Dum-Dum (album), The Vaselines first full-length LP
Dum Dum (album), a 1991 album by Serbian rock band Ekatarina Velika
"Dum Dum" (song), a 1961 single by Brenda Lee
"Dum Dum", a song by Cheryl from A Million Lights
Dumdums (band), a British guitar-pop band that split in August 2001
Dumdum (musical instrument), a one-string bass from Zimbabwe
Dum-Dum (rapper) (born 1969), Brazilian rapper and composer, member of Facção Central

Other uses 
Dum Dums (lollipop), a brand of lollipop

See also 
Dum Dum Girls, an American rock band
Dum Dum Dugan, a fictional character who appears in publications from Marvel Comics
Dumdum bullet or Dum-dum, an obsolete design of expanding bullet
Dum Dum Arsenal, the British India Army arsenal where this design was developed for colonial use
Touché Turtle and Dum Dum, one of the segments from The New Hanna-Barbera Cartoon Series, produced by Hanna-Barbera in 1962
Dumb Dumb (disambiguation)